OU Health is the combination of OU Medical Center – Oklahoma City & Edmond, the Children's Hospital, OU Physicians, OU Children's Physicians, the University of Oklahoma College of Medicine, and the Peggy and Charles Stephenson Oklahoma Cancer Center. OU Health focuses on improving health by collaboration, searching for innovation and encouraging high performance.

OU Medical Center
OU Medical Center is located in central Oklahoma City on the Oklahoma Health Center campus, just east of downtown Oklahoma City and south of the State Capitol building.

The main OU Medical Center building which houses the main hospital is Presbyterian Tower, which had been the Presbyterian Hospital. In 2010 OU Medical Center celebrated its 100th anniversary.

OU Medical Center has 680 beds. Most of OU Medical Center's and the Children's Hospital-affiliated physicians are a part of OU Physicians and faculty with the OU College of Medicine and see patients in over 60 adult and child specialties.

OU Medical Center is home to Oklahoma's only Level One Trauma center as verified by the American College of Surgeons. The trauma center is located on the west side of Presbyterian Tower, and houses four Medi Flight transports which can be seen on the helipad from Lincoln Boulevard.

Unique services at OU Medical Center include comprehensive cancer care including a Gamma Knife Center for treating brain tumors that can't be treated by conventional methods, a Bone Marrow Transplant Center and Oklahoma's newest and largest Radiation Therapy Center.

OU Medical Center also houses the Oklahoma Transplant Center. On February 1, 2018, OU Medicine became a locally owned and managed nonprofit.

OU Medical Center Edmond 

OU Medical Center Edmond is located in central Edmond, Oklahoma just east of the University of Central Oklahoma campus.

Until April 2010, OU Medical Center Edmond was known as Edmond Medical Center. OU Medical Center Edmond primarily serves the people of Edmond in northern Oklahoma County, and southern Logan County.

In 2010, the hospital began a $17 million expansion and renovation. Construction includes renovation to reintroduction the much anticipated maternal child services back into Edmond. Other updates include expansion to the Emergency Department, internal and external facelifts, and new diagnostic and surgical equipment.

The Children’s Hospital at OU Medical Center 

The Children's Hospital at OU Medical Center is located in central Oklahoma City on the OUHSC campus. It is Oklahoma's only full-service pediatric medical care facility.

In April 2011, the Atrium was opened to the public and now serves as the main entrance to the Children's Hospital. The Emergency Room entrance was moved to N.E. 13th Street.

The Children's Hospital affiliates physicians practice as part of OU Children's Physicians and work in over 50 pediatric specialties.

The Children's Hospital is home to the Women's and Newborn Center, which is known for its high risk specialty care for mothers and newborns. The Women's and Newborn Center is home to the only midwifery service in a central Oklahoma hospital and the only comprehensive lactation service in Oklahoma. It also offers a wide range of prenatal courses and classes.

In 2010, the Pediatric Urology Department at The Children's Hospital was ranked as the 14th best Urology Department in the nation by U.S. News & World Report. And, the Stroke Center at OU Medical Center was awarded the Gold Seal of Approval from The Joint Commission for Primary Stroke Centers.

OU Physicians 

OU Physicians is the clinical practice of the University of Oklahoma College of Medicine, and affiliated physician group for OU Medical Center. OU Physicians office in several different buildings on the Oklahoma Health Center campus. Some of the physicians office in the OU Physicians Building constructed in 2001. OU Physicians also have offices in other areas of Oklahoma City, along with Edmond, Enid, Tulsa and other cities around the state.

With more than 475 doctors and other health care providers, OU Physicians is the largest physician group in Oklahoma.  Since the creation of its College of Medicine in the early 1900s, OU's academic health faculty has cared for patients as well as pioneering new treatments through research.

In the early 1990s, College of Medicine leadership charted a vision for an expanded role in patient care.  As a not-for-profit institution, revenues from this clinical practice fund the teaching and research aspects of the college.  Growth in these revenues would enable the college to significantly strengthen the facilities, staff, breadth and renown of the OU College of Medicine.  Based upon this, the faculty practice plan was established in July 1991.  Thus, leadership and many functional operations changed from a department-based model to a multi-specialty group practice with a shared management team, governance and standards, managed care contracting and marketing. The group shared the name University Physicians Medical Group from 1996 to 2001, when it was renamed OU Physicians.

OU Children's Physicians 

OU Children's Physicians has more than 150 doctors in over 50 child specialties. The majority of these doctors are board certified in child specialties and many of them offer child-specific services that are unavailable elsewhere in Oklahoma. Some have even pioneered surgical procedures or innovations in patient care that are world firsts.

Thirteen OU Children's Physicians hold Children's Medical Research Institute (CMRI) Endowed Chairs. Through endowed programs, CMRI helps fund the research and education efforts of leading pediatric doctors at the OU Health Sciences Center.

OU Children's Physicians specialists care for everyday conditions and for ongoing or complex health conditions. These specialists include:

 More pediatric cardiologists than any other practice in the state
 The state's only comprehensive pediatric care for types 1 and 2 diabetes
 The only two pediatric neurosurgeons in Oklahoma City
 The only pediatric surgeons in south and central Oklahoma
 The only pediatric stem cell transplantation team in the state
 The only comprehensive bleeding disorders program in the state
 The only team in the state caring for children who have kidney transplants
 Board-certified, fellowship-trained pediatric urologists, one of whom pioneered urological tissue engineering to create functional bladders

Stephenson Cancer Center 
The Stephenson Cancer Center, formerly known as the OU Cancer Institute, is located on the University of Oklahoma Health Sciences Center campus in Oklahoma City. Under the guidance of Robert Mannel, MD, Director, the mission of the Cancer Center is to promote and support cancer research, education, care, and patient support for Oklahomans and beyond.

Members of the Stephenson Cancer Center—including faculty from University of Oklahoma Health Sciences Center, OU Norman, OU Tulsa, Oklahoma State University, Oklahoma City University, University of Central Oklahoma, Northeastern State University, and the Oklahoma Medical Research Foundation conduct innovative and nationally funded cancer research in the basic, clinical and population sciences. Regardless of expertise or home institution, all members of the Stephenson Cancer Center share a common goal: reducing the morbidity and mortality caused by cancer in Oklahoma and beyond.

In 2002, the National Cancer Institute awarded the SCC a P20 Planning Grant to lay the groundwork for Oklahoma's first and only NCI-Designated Cancer Center. Achieving this designation, the gold standard for cancer research and care in the United States, will mean that Oklahomans will no longer need to travel out-of-state for comprehensive, state-of-the-art cancer care.

Oklahoma moved one step closer to NCI-Designation in November 2004, when state voters approved State Question 713, which restructured and increased the tax on tobacco products. Revenues from this tax are targeted for a number of health care initiatives, including the construction of a $120 million cancer clinical research and treatment facility in Oklahoma City and smaller facility in Tulsa. The new facility in Oklahoma City opened in July 2011, and serves as a major cancer resource for cancer patients, investigators and health professionals from around the state and across the nation. The building offers patients and families everything needed under one roof, including the most experienced and largest number of cancer specialists, the most advanced technology and a unique environment intended to reduce the "clinical feel" of most out-patient medical facilities. The Stephenson Cancer Center provides out-patient services to adults (although pediatric patients are treated with radiation therapy in the building), and patients are admitted to the OU Medical Center if they require hospitalization.

In 2006, the University of Oklahoma launched a $50 million private fundraising campaign to create endowed chairs and establish programs in cancer research and clinical care. The campaign goal was met when Tulsa residents Peggy and Charles Stephenson pledged $12 million to support the Cancer Center, then the largest gift ever to the OU Health Sciences Center.

In 2018, the Stephenson Cancer Center was officially awarded NCI Designation, becoming the first in Oklahoma to do so.

See also 
 University of Oklahoma College of Medicine
University of Oklahoma Health Sciences Center

References

External links
 OU Medicine
 University of Oklahoma
 University of Oklahoma Health Science Center
 Peggy and Charles Stephenson Oklahoma Cancer Center

Hospitals in Oklahoma
Children's hospitals in the United States
Healthcare in Oklahoma
Hospital networks in the United States
Hospitals established in 1910